Finn George O'Mara (born 3 February 1999) is an English footballer who plays for Herne Bay on loan from Hastings United. He can operate as either centre-back or right-back.

Career

Youth

O'Mara was born in the London Borough of Southwark and grew up in Wilmington, Kent. He attended St Columba's Catholic Boys' School in Bexleyheath, London. Before joining the Gillingham youth system, O'Mara was playing for Dartford, getting a trial from a family friend who happened to be a youth coach there and making it into the under-14s on account of one of the players getting tonsillitis. Having four weeks to get into the team, he managed to do it and they won the league that season, catching the attention of Gillingham where he then moved.

Despite being a defender, O'Mara started out as a central midfielder in his youth.

Gillingham

Promoted to the Gillingham squad from the academy in 2017, 2017-18 would be the defender's first full season as a professional. He made his League One debut against Blackburn Rovers on 30 September 2017 as substitute for the injured Mark Byrne.

Folkestone Invicta

On 12 October 2018, O'Mara signed an 18-month contract with Isthmian League Premier Division side Folkestone Invicta, having previously had a spell on loan with the club during the previous season. 

In January 2021, he joined National League South side Welling United on a month-long loan deal due to the Isthmian League being suspended due to Covid.

Hastings United
On 19 November 2021, he dropped down a division to join Isthmian League South East Division side Hastings United on a one-month loan deal, going straight into the squad for the clash with Sussex rivals Three Bridges.  He signed for the club on a permanent basis in January 2022.

In January 2023, he joined Herne Bay on loan having spent time at Cray Valley Paper Mills earlier in the season.

References

External links
 
 Kentonline tag
 Profile at Aylesbury United FC

1999 births
Living people
People from Wilmington, Kent
English footballers
Footballers from the London Borough of Southwark
Gillingham F.C. players
Folkestone Invicta F.C. players
Welling United F.C. players
Hastings United F.C. players
Cray Valley Paper Mills F.C. players
Herne Bay F.C. players
English Football League players
National League (English football) players
Isthmian League players
Association football defenders